Alferikha is a rural locality (a village) in Seletskoye Rural Settlement, Suzdalsky District, Vladimir Oblast, Russia. The population was 7 as of 2010.

Geography 
Alferikha is located 15 km northeast of Suzdal (the district's administrative centre) by road. Pogost-Bykovo is the nearest rural locality.

References 

Rural localities in Suzdalsky District